2008 Thailand League Division 2 in association football league competitions was contested by the two Group league winners of the 3rd level championships of Thailand.

The league winners and runners up  Group A and Group B were promoted to Thailand Division 1 League. No teams would be relegated due to restructuring at the end of the season.

Member clubs

Group A
Cha Choeng Sao (Relegation from 2007 Thailand League Division 1 11th Group B)
Chiangmai United
Nakhon Ratchasima (Relegation from 2007 Thailand League Division 1 9th Group B)
Narathiwat (Relegation from 2007 Thailand League Division 1 8th Group A)
Prachinburi
Raj Pracha  (Promoted 2007-08 Khǒr Royal Cup (ถ้วย ข.) Winner)
Ratchaburi (Relegation from 2007 Thailand League Division 1 12th Group A)
Samut Prakan 
Sakon Nakhon (Relegation from 2007 Thailand League Division 1 10th Group A)
Satun  
Songkhla (Promoted from 2007 Provincial League Runner-Up)

Group B 
Airforce Training College (Relegation from 2007 Thailand League Division 1 9th Group A)
Army Welfare Department
Bangkok Bravo (Relegation from 2007 Thailand League Division 1 11th Group A)
Bangkok Christian College
Bangkok North Central ASSN (Relegation from 2007 Thailand League Division 1 8th Group B)
Kasem Bundit University (Promoted 2007-08 Khǒr Royal Cup (ถ้วย ข.) Runner-Up)
Rajadamnern Thonburi College
Lopburi (Promoted from 2007 Provincial League Winner)
Royal Thai Marine Corps (Relegation from 2007 Thailand League Division 1 12th Group B)
Navy Fleet Support
Sisaket (Relegation from 2007 Thailand League Division 1 10th Group B)

2008 Thailand League Division 2 All locations

Stadium and locations (Group A)

Stadium and locations (Group B)

Results

League table (Group A)

League table (Group B)

Qualification

List of qualified teams
Last Update October 1, 2011

(Group A) (2)
 Prachinburi FC  (Winner)
 Songkhla FC (Runner-up)

(Group B) (2)
 Army Welfare Department F.C.  (Winner)
 Si Saket FC (Runner-up)

3/4 Place

Final

Champions
The 2008 winner of the Thailand Division 2 League Championship was Prachinburi FC.

See also
 2008 Thailand Premier League
 2008 Thailand League Division 1
Thailand 2008 RSSSF

References

3